Bernard Guetta (born 28 January 1951) is a French politician and journalist who was elected as a Member of the European Parliament in 2019.

Career 
He was born to Pierre Guetta, a Franco-Italian sociologist from a Moroccan Jewish family, and his first wife, Ines Francine Bourla, a gallerist of tribal art. His sister, Nathalie Guetta, is an actress active in Italy. 

In addition to his committee assignments, Guetta is part of the Spinelli Group, the European Parliament Intergroup on Seas, Rivers, Islands and Coastal Areas and the MEPs Against Cancer group.

Personal life 
By father's side, he is the half-brother of record producer, songwriter and DJ David Guetta.

Bibliography 
Patron Mai, Le Seuil, 1975
Éloge de la Tortue, Le Monde, Actualités, 1991 
Pologne, with Philippe Barbey, Arthaud 1992 
Géopolitique, L'Olivier, 1995 
L'Europe fédérale, with Philippe Labarde, Grasset, 2002 
 Le Monde est mon métier : Le journaliste, les pouvoirs et la vérité, with Jean Lacouture, Grasset, 2007, 
 Michel Rocard, Alain Juppé with Bernard Guetta, La Politique, telle qu'elle meurt de ne pas être, JCLattès, 2011 , 2nd edition (paperback), J'ai lu, 2012 
 L'an I des révolutions arabes : décembre 2010-janvier 2012, Belin, 2012 
 Intime Conviction. Comment je suis devenu européen, Le Seuil, 2014 
 Dans l'ivresse de l'histoire, Flammarion, 2017 , 2nd edition (paperback), J'ai lu, 2018 
 L'Enquête hongroise (puis polonaise, italienne et autrichienne), Flammarion, 2019 , 2nd edition (paperback), J'ai lu, 2020

References

1951 births
Living people
Lycée Henri-IV alumni
MEPs for France 2019–2024
People from Boulogne-Billancourt
Politicians from Île-de-France
20th-century French journalists
21st-century French journalists
Albert Londres Prize recipients
French columnists
Young Leaders of the French-American Foundation
French people of Italian descent
French people of Moroccan-Jewish descent